The Armed Forces Law Association of New Zealand was formed in 2000 by lawyers in the military justice system, and those with a professional interest in the law of the armed forces of the Crown, and of the law of armed conflict.

Law-related professional associations
Organizations established in 2000
2000 establishments in New Zealand